North Marden is a tiny village on the spur of the South Downs in the Chichester district of West Sussex, England. It is within the civil parish of Marden, West Sussex, 7.5 miles (12 km) northwest of Chichester on the B2141 road.

North Marden is one of the smallest, out-of-the-way parishes in Sussex. At the end of the 19th century the population was between 20 and 30 inhabitants. The parish is mentioned in the Taxatio records of Pope Nicholas IV (1291) and in the Novae return (1341).

The plan of the Church of St Mary, approached through a farmyard, is simple but unusual in the chancel having an apsidal, or semi-circular termination. The elaborate Norman south doorway in Caen stone suggests a date of the middle of the 12th century. The three Norman windows in the apse have been restored, but the jambs and rere-arches are ancient along with the small Norman window at the west end. The Norman sandstone font was provided an octagonal stem base in the 14th century, and parts of the ancient flint walls were repaired in places with 18th-century brickwork. The single bell dates from 1829.

References

External links

Villages in West Sussex